Jacob Leon VanCompernolle (born August 2, 1993) is an American professional soccer player who last played as a defender for OKC Energy U23 in the Premier Development League.

Career

College & Youth
VanCompernolle played four years college soccer at the University of North Carolina at Wilmington between 2011 and 2014. In his senior year, VanCompernolle was the CAA's Defensive Player-of-the-Year and a first-team All-CAA honoree.

While at college, VanCompernolle appeared for USL PDL side Ottawa Fury during their 2013 season and GPS Portland Phoenix during their 2014 season.

Professional
After trials with New England Revolution and Colorado Rapids, VanCompernolle signed with United Soccer League side Oklahoma City Energy on February 11, 2015.

VanCompernolle signed with Sporting Kansas City's United Soccer League development side Swope Park Rangers on January 8, 2016.

References

1993 births
Living people
American soccer players
UNC Wilmington Seahawks men's soccer players
Ottawa Fury (2005–2013) players
GPS Portland Phoenix players
OKC Energy FC players
Sporting Kansas City II players
Association football defenders
Soccer players from Texas
USL League Two players
USL Championship players